Kentucky Route 59 (KY 59) is a  state highway in Kentucky.

Route description
KY 59 starts at a junction with KY 2 near Olive Hill in Carter County. This is the only major junction in the county. KY 59 enters Lewis County south of Emerson. It intersects KY 1662 there. Then, KY 59 meets KY 1068 and KY 474 before reaching Kinniconick, where it intersects with KY 344; all four routes terminate at KY 59. In Vanceburg, KY 59 intersects with KY 9, KY 10, and KY 1149 before terminating at KY 8.

Junction list

See also

References

0059
Transportation in Carter County, Kentucky
Transportation in Lewis County, Kentucky